Herlong Recreational Airport , also known as Herlong Field, then Herlong Airport, is a public airport located eight nautical miles (13 km) southwest of the central business district of Jacksonville, a city in Duval County, Florida, United States.

This airport is assigned a three-letter location identifier of HEG by the Federal Aviation Administration, but it does not have an International Air Transport Association (IATA) airport code.

The Jacksonville Aviation Authority (JAA) is the owner of all four public airports in Jacksonville and serves as the Fixed-Base Operator (FBO) at Herlong. The airport was originally built during World War II to facilitate pilot training for the Navy and Air Force. After the war, the property was given to the city, and subsequently the JAA.

In recognition of the improvements and excellent operations, Herlong Recreational Airport was named the Florida Department of Transportation's General Aviation Airport of the Year in 2001.

Facilities and aircraft 

For the 12-month period ending October 20, 1999, the airport had 80,700 aircraft operations, an average of 221 per day: 97% general aviation and 3% military. There are 162 aircraft based at this airport: 70% single-engine, 9% multi-engine, 10% ultralight, 8% glider and 2% helicopter.

References

External links
 Herlong Recreational Airport page at the Jacksonville Aviation Authority website
  brochure from CFASPP
 

Airports in Jacksonville, Florida